Walter Zobell (born April 21, 1950) is an American sports shooter. He competed in the mixed trap event at the 1984 Summer Olympics.

References

External links
 

1950 births
Living people
American male sport shooters
Olympic shooters of the United States
Shooters at the 1984 Summer Olympics
Sportspeople from Provo, Utah
Pan American Games medalists in shooting
Pan American Games gold medalists for the United States
Shooters at the 1975 Pan American Games
Shooters at the 1979 Pan American Games